The first series of the British medical drama television series Casualty began airing on 6 September 1986, and concluded on 27 December 1986. The show was created by Jeremy Brock and Paul Unwin after the pair were both hospitalised for different reasons. Brock and Unwin were deeply concerned with what they saw within hospitals and decided to pitch a document in 1985 for the BBC. It was reported the pitch document 'read like a manifesto', and the show was then commissioned. Geraint Morris was appointed as the show's producer. Casualty was commissioned to boost ratings on BBC One at peak times after ratings began to decline between 1984 and 1985. Prior to first series airing, Brock and Unwin visited a hospital in Bristol where they met a charge nurse called Pete Salt. Salt was appointed the series medical advisor. 

The first series of Casualty consisted of fifteen episodes, which aired weekly on a Saturday night. Each episode was individually titled. The first series featured ten main characters, who were all appointed different roles within the A&E department. By the end of the first series, two actors would not be returning for the second series: Julia Watson (Baz Samuels) and George Harris (Clive King).

Cast

Overview 
The first series of Casualty featured ten main characters. All ten characters were introduced in the first episode of the series. The fifteenth episode saw the last appearances of characters Baz Samuels and Clive King, whose respective departures would be explained in the second series. The other eight characters reprised their roles in series two.

Throughout the duration of the first series, there were seven notable actors who appeared in guest roles. Graham Cole played a junior doctor in episode one, Michael Garner played PC McMorrow in episode four, Alfred Molina played Fleet Street journalist Harry Horner in episode four, while Vas Blackwood also appeared in episode four, as Bob. Stella Gonet played Clare Wainwright, a specialist registrar in general medicine in episode seven, while Perry Fenwick played patient Marvin Osborne in episode nine.

Main characters 

Lisa Bowerman as Sandra Mute
Brenda Fricker as Megan Roach
Bernard Gallagher as Ewart Plimmer
George Harris as Clive King (until episode 15)
Robert Pugh as Andrew Ponting
Debbie Roza as Susie Mercier
Christopher Rozycki as Kuba Trzcinski
Cathy Shipton as Lisa "Duffy" Duffin
Derek Thompson as Charlie Fairhead
Julia Watson as Barbara "Baz" Samuels (until episode 15)

Development
The idea of Casualty came together when co-creators Jeremy Brock and Paul Unwin were both hospitalised for different reasons. During their time at the hospital, the pair were 'deeply concerned by what they saw'. Brock and Unwin pitched a document and sent it to the BBC in 1985. Unwin said in an interview with Radio Times that their pitch 'read like a manifesto', with the first sentence being: "In 1948, a dream was born - a National Health Service. In 1985, the dream is in tatters." Unwin said that he and Brock were both 'left–wing and passionate', and that they 'knew what stories there were to tell'. After the commissioning of Casualty, the BBC decided to team Unwin and Brock up with television producer Geraint Morris. 

One of the reasons Casualty was produced was to help boost decreasing ratings for the BBC between 1984 and 1985 during peak viewing times on Friday and Saturday evenings. Before Brock and Unwin scripted the first series, they took a visit to a hospital based in Bristol. There, they met Pete Salt, a charge nurse. Salt was appointed the series medical advisor, advising the team of Casualty on what was and wasn't medically possible or accurate.

Episodes

References

External links
 Casualty series 1 at the Internet Movie Database

01
1986 British television seasons